Glenn Roberts "Rob" Laird (born December 29, 1954) is a Canadian retired professional ice hockey left winger who played in one National Hockey League game for the Minnesota North Stars during the 1979–80 NHL season.

Early life 
Laird was born in Regina, Saskatchewan. He played junior hockey with the Regina Pats from 1971 to 1974.

Career 
Laird was drafted 116th overall in the 1974 NHL Amateur Draft by the Pittsburgh Penguins and 29th overall in the 1974 WHA Amateur Draft by the Minnesota Fighting Saints.

He played eight seasons with the Fort Wayne Komets and on March 6, 2002, he was inducted into the Komet Hall of Fame, in which he was honored with his jersey number #18 retired.

He also coached the AHL's Baltimore Skipjacks and Moncton Hawks as well as the IHL's Fort Wayne Komets and Phoenix Roadrunners. He served as an assistant coach for the Washington Capitals in the 1989–90 season.

Laird is a senior pro scout for the Los Angeles Kings, having joined the club in the 1997–98 season.

Career statistics

Awards and honours

See also
List of players who played only one game in the NHL

References

External links

Rob Laird's profile at HockeyDraftCentral.com

1954 births
Living people
Canadian expatriate ice hockey players in the United States
Canadian ice hockey coaches
Canadian ice hockey left wingers
Fort Wayne Komets players
Ice hockey people from Saskatchewan
Los Angeles Kings scouts
Minnesota Fighting Saints draft picks
Minnesota North Stars players
Nashville South Stars players
Oklahoma City Stars players
Pittsburgh Penguins draft picks
Regina Pats players
Sportspeople from Regina, Saskatchewan
Washington Capitals coaches